Bar Yehuda Airfield (Hebrew מנחת בר־יהודה, minḥat bar-yehuda; sometimes known as Masada Airfield) , named after Israel Bar-Yehuda, is a small desert airfield located in the southern Judean desert, between Arad and Ein Gedi, west of the Dead Sea. Opened in 1963, it is just  from the Masada fortress access and about one hour and a half drive from Jerusalem. The airfield is a public concession, mainly used as an alternate airport, and for charter and sightseeing flights.

See also
 Extreme points of Earth - Lowest attainable by transportation
 List of places on land with elevations below sea level

External links
 Airports Worldwide: Bar Yehuda Airfield
 Israir 's page about this destination

Airports in Israel